Region 5 is the name of a Statistics Canada census division, one of six in the Northwest Territories, Canada. It was introduced in the 2011 census, along with Regions 1, 2, 3, 4, and 6, resulting in the abolition of the former census divisions of Fort Smith Region and Inuvik Region (the latter not to be confused with the modern-day administrative region of the same name). Unlike in some other provinces, census divisions do not reflect the organization of local government in the Northwest Territories. These areas exist solely for the purposes of statistical analysis and presentation; they have no government of their own.

Its territory coincides roughly with much of the South Slave Region administrative region; however, it does not include the extreme western part of South Slave Region centered on Fort Providence, west of Great Slave Lake.

Main languages in the Region include English (86.4%), Dene (4.0%), French (2.2%), Slavey (1.6%) and Cree (1.5%).

Demographics 

Communities

Towns
Fort Smith
Hay River
Hamlets
Fort Resolution
Settlements
Enterprise
Łutselk'e
Reliance
Indian reserves
Salt Plains

References

South Slave Region
Census divisions of the Canadian territories